Charlie Wilcox is a children's novel by Sharon E. McKay about a boy from Newfoundland in World War I. First published in 2000, the novel won the Geoffrey Bilson Award and the Violet Downey Award. It is followed by a sequel, Charlie Wilcox's Great War, published in 2003.

Plot introduction
The book opens in Newfoundland in 1915. Charlie Wilcox's parents want him to go to college rather than become a seal hunter like his father; they believe that his club foot makes him unfit for an active life. To prove his courage and ability, fourteen-year-old Charlie decides to stow away on a sealing vessel; however, he finds himself instead on a troop ship bound for the war in Europe. Rather than return, he chooses to become a stretcher bearer at the front where he witnesses the horrors of trench warfare and the Battle of the Somme.

References

External links 
 Publisher's site

2000 Canadian novels
2000 children's books
Children's historical novels
Canadian children's novels
Fiction set in 1915
Novels set during World War I